Mikhail Alexandrovich Maslin (born 1947) is a Russian historian of philosophy and Distinguished Professor at the Lomonosov Moscow State University (2001) where he holds the chair of Russian Philosophy (since 1992). Prof. Maslin has published over 80 scientific works, including a number of monographs and textbooks.

Selected publications 
  Маслин М. А., book review of Anna Crone's Eros and Creativity in Russian Religious Renewal (The Bulletin of Saint Tikhon's Orthodox University). «Серия 1: Богословие. Философия. Религиоведение», выпуск 2 (34). 2011

Bibliography 
 Маслин, Михаил Александрович // Большая русская биографическая энциклопедия (электронное издание). — Версия 3.0. — М.: Бизнессофт, ИДДК, 2007. // Алексеев П. В. Философы России XIX—XX столетий. Биографии, идеи, труды. — 4-е изд., перераб. и доп. — М.: Академический проект, 2002. — 1152 с.

References 

Academic staff of Moscow State University
Soviet philosophers
Russian philosophers
Historians of philosophy
Academic journal editors
1947 births
Living people